Fanfare for a Witch is a 1954 historical novel by the British writer Vaughan Wilkins. It is set in Britain during the reign of George II. It is set against the background of the long-running dispute between George and his eldest son and heir Frederick, Prince of Wales.

References

Bibliography
 Logasa, Hannah. Historical Fiction: Guide for Junior and Senior High Schools and Colleges, Also for General Reader. McKinley Publishing Company, 1964.

1954 British novels
Novels by Vaughan Wilkins
British historical novels
Novels set in London
Novels set in the 18th century
Jonathan Cape books